is a fictional character and the main protagonist from the manga and anime television series, Ouran High School Host Club, created by Bisco Hatori. In the manga and its adaptations, Haruhi takes on the role of a male host playing a comical tsukkomi, despite being of female sex, by keeping her gender as female a secret from the host club's clients. While her fellow, all-male Host Club members know the truth, the club's clients do not and mistakenly believe Haruhi to be a male, thus providing the basis for much of the gender-swapping satire embedded in the comedy.

The character self-identifies as female, while downplaying gender roles to comic effect throughout the series. As explanation, she tells the others that "it's more important for a person to be recognized for who they are rather than what sex they are".

This attitude is reflected in comments made by mangaka Hatori Bisco at a 2019 convention. Haruhi's character was positively received, both because of her down-to-earth personality and disregard for gender roles in society.

Character

At the start of the Ouran High School Host Club manga and anime, Haruhi enters the prestigious Ouran Academy on a scholarship. Looking for a quiet place to study, she stumbles upon the school's male-only host club, where she is initially mistaken for a boy due to her short hair and oversized clothing because she lacks sufficient funds to purchase a female school uniform. After knocking over an expensive vase, the club forces her to work off her debt by becoming a host. Haruhi identifies herself as a biological female, but does not view gender identity as important. She therefore agrees to portray herself as a boy in order to repay her debt to the club. She carries on, keeping her sex secret from the club's clientele, by wearing a male uniform and using masculine pronouns. At first, Haruhi dislikes being forced to work for the host club. However, as the plot advances, Haruhi slowly grows less introverted and starts to realize that the boys of the host club have become her best friends who are helping her to learn and grow into a better person. The episodes consist of comedic explorations gender performance. Unlike other shōjo heroines that Ouran High School Host Club parodies, Haruhi is an independent, hard-working, asocial character who "embraces, if not a genderqueer identity, then at least a gender-ambivalent one."

Development
Caitlin Glass, the English-voice actress of Haruhi, has noted that the character is both among her most challenging and her favorite roles. In an interview with Swerve, she described how difficult it was to "believably [be] a boy [while] still appealing even to a male audience." Taking the dual role of director and lead character, Glass said she felt like she had "something to prove" and, initially, she was under great pressure.

Reception
Ramsey Isler of IGN listed Haruhi among his 25 "greatest anime characters." Stating that while the reverse harem genre of anime had been "done to death" by the time the Ouran High School Host Club anime was released, Haruhi's character went against the established tropes of the genre. Described as "super tomboyish, demure, and not at all moe," Haruhi is considered a good contrast to the eccentric cast of rich boys.  In an anime review, IGNs D.F. Smith praised both Caitlin Glass and Maaya Sakamoto for their performance as Haruhi in their respective languages, reporting that it is a "tricky role". Sakamoto was nominated for a Seiyu Award in 2007 for her portrayal of Haruhi.

Rose Bridges of Anime News Network lauded Haruhi as one of the "freshest elements" of the anime. Comparing Haruhi to Tohru Honda from Fruits Basket and Tsukushi Makino from Boys Over Flowers because of her strong sense of empathy and her "take-no-crap" attitude respectively, Bridges praised the character for her intelligence, ability to speak her mind and her "blasé approach to gender roles."

Haruhi's gender orientation has long been a moot point. In 2014, Aja Romano of The Daily Dot called Haruhi one of the "rare cases" where a character refuses to return to "safely heteronormative territory. Writing for The Mary Sue in 2015, Alenka Figa considered the Ouran series as one of the "Top 5 Queer Voices in Anime," citing Haruhi's attitude regarding gender roles as evidence. In contrast, Reuben Baron (2018) and Jessica Thomas (2020) of Comic Book Resources fail to include Haruhi in their expanded lists of genderqueer characters.

Mangaka Bisco Hatori appeared at Anime Expo 2019 held at the Los Angeles Convention Center in Los Angeles, California, USA. When questioned about Haruhi Fujioka, she revealed that Haruhi was originally meant to be a boy, but one of her editors suggested a gender swap. Thus, Hatori invented a female character that "doesn't need to dress up like a boy other than the fact that those are the clothing she wears and likes" without adding subtext regarding gender identity. She expressed that she isn't hung up on genre parameters or gender orientation because every person should be proud of being unique while remaining true to themselves. In summation, Hatori stressed Ouran being a story about family and friendship, without any intention of being a pioneer of "fujoshi comedy," though admits that it happened just the same.

References

External links
Official Ouran High School Host Club manga website 
Official NTV Ouran High School Host Club anime website 
Official Funimation Ouran website

Ouran High School Host Club
Comics characters introduced in 2002
Fictional characters from Tokyo
Fictional cross-dressers
Fictional Japanese people in anime and manga
Female characters in anime and manga
Teenage characters in anime and manga
Teenage characters in television
Fictional high school students